Metamerism may refer to:
 Metamerism (biology), in zoology and developmental biology, the property of having repeated segments, as in annelids
 Metamerism (color), in colorimetry, a perceived matching of colors that, based on differences in spectral power distribution, do not actually match
 In chemistry, the chemical property of having the same number and type of atomic components in different arrangements (see structural isomer)